Ottone Olivieri, also credited as Otone Olivijeri, was an Italian-Yugoslav basketball player. He represented the Yugoslavia national basketball team internationally.

Playing career 
Olivieri played for the CRDA Monfalcone of the Italian Lega Basket Serie A in the beginning of 1940s. After the end of Second World War, he was one of the founders of the club Kvarner in Rijeka. Later he moved to Split where he took a part in development of KK Split.

National team career
Olivieri was a member of the Yugoslavia national team which participated at the 1947 FIBA European Championship. Over five tournament games, he averaged 5.2 points per game.

Personal life 
His older brother Albano was a basketball player.

References

1917 births
Croatian people of Italian descent
Italians of Croatia
Italian men's basketball players
People from Rijeka
Basketball players from Rijeka
Yugoslav men's basketball players

Place of death missing
Date of death missing
KK Kvarner players